Belinda Cornish is a Canadian actress and playwright based in Edmonton, Alberta. She is most noted for her role in the television series Tiny Plastic Men, for which she received a Canadian Screen Award nomination for Best Actress in a Comedy Series at the 4th Canadian Screen Awards in 2016.

Her plays have included Diamond Dog, Thrubwell's Pies, Little Elephants, Category E and an adaptation of Todd Babiak's novel The Garneau Block.

Filmography

Film

Television

Video games

References

External links

21st-century Canadian actresses
21st-century Canadian dramatists and playwrights
21st-century Canadian women writers
Canadian television actresses
Canadian film actresses
Canadian stage actresses
Canadian women dramatists and playwrights
Actresses from Edmonton
Writers from Edmonton
Living people
Year of birth missing (living people)